It'll Be Me may refer to

"It'll Be Me" (Exile song) (1986)
"It'll Be Me" (Jerry Lee Lewis song) (1957)